The 8888 Uprising, also known as the People Power Uprising and the 1988 Uprising, was a series of nationwide protests, marches, and riots in Burma (present-day Myanmar) that peaked in August 1988. Key events occurred on 8 August 1988 and therefore it is commonly known as the "8888 Uprising". The protests began as a student movement and were organised largely by university students at the Rangoon Arts and Sciences University and the Rangoon Institute of Technology (RIT).

Since 1962, the Burma Socialist Programme Party had ruled the country as a totalitarian one-party state, headed by General Ne Win. Under the government agenda, called the Burmese Way to Socialism, which involved economic isolation and the strengthening of the military, Burma became one of the world's most impoverished countries. Many firms in the formal sector of the economy were nationalised, and the government combined Soviet-style central planning with Buddhist and traditional beliefs and superstition.

The 8888 uprising was started by students in Yangon (Rangoon) on 8 August 1988. Student protests spread throughout the country. Hundreds of thousands of monks, children, university students, housewives, doctors and common people protested against the government. The uprising ended on 18 September after a bloody military coup by the State Law and Order Restoration Council (SLORC). Thousands of deaths have been attributed to the military during this uprising, while authorities in Burma put the figure at around 350 people killed.

During the crisis, Aung San Suu Kyi emerged as a national icon. When the military junta arranged an election in 1990, her party, the National League for Democracy, won 81% of the seats in the government (392 out of 492). However, the military junta refused to recognise the results and continued to rule the country as the State Law and Order Restoration Council. Aung San Suu Kyi was also placed under house arrest. The State Law and Order Restoration Council would be a cosmetic change from the Burma Socialist Programme Party. Suu Kyi's house arrest was lifted in 2010, when worldwide attention for her peaked again during the making of the biographical film The Lady. The Tatmadaw again seized control of the country in the 2021 Myanmar coup d'état, which began with the imprisonment of then State Councillor Aung San Suu Kyi. The coup has led to numerous protests and demonstrations against the military-led government. Activists have compared the current coup resistance movement to the 8888 Uprising.

Background

Economic problems
Before the crisis, Burma had been ruled by the repressive and isolated regime of General Ne Win since 1962. The country had a national debt of $3.5 billion and currency reserves of between $20 million and $35 million, with debt service ratios standing at half of the national budget.

1985 and 1987 demonetisation crises
In the years leading up to the crisis, General Ne Win had imposed two instances of sudden currency demonetisation that declared certain circulated denominations of currency invalid. These instances led to instantaneous loss of savings for many Burmese citizens and economic instability. On 3 November 1985, the Burmese government declared notes of 20, 50, and 100 kyats invalid, without prior warning to the public. Prior to this, circulated denominations were of 1, 5, 10, 20, 50, and 100 kyats. The stated reason for the demonetisation was to combat black market activity. The public was given only a short period of time to exchange their 20, 50, and 100 kyat bills, and only 25% of the value of surrendered bills were reimbursed. On 10 November 1985, a week after the initial announcement of demonetisation, new denominations of 25, 35, and 75 kyat bills were announced, with the 75 kyat denomination chosen to commemorate Ne Win's 75th birthday. In November 1985, students gathered and boycotted the government's decision to withdraw Burmese local currency notes. Economic problems coupled with counter-insurgency required continuous involvement in the international market.

On 5 September 1987, Ne Win announced the demonetisation of the 25, 35, and 75 kyat notes, leaving only the 1, 5, and 10 kyat bills valid. This announcement was also with no prior warning, and this time no exchange for valid tender was allowed. Roughly 60–80% of circulated legal tender was declared invalid without warning, and millions of Burmese citizens had their savings eliminated by this action. On 22 September 1987, the Burmese government introduced new denominations of 45 and 90 kyat notes. The 45 and 90 kyat denominations were chosen because the two numbers are divisible by 9, which was considered lucky by Ne Win.

Students in particular were angry at the 1987 demonetisation as savings for tuition fees were wiped out instantly. Students from the Rangoon Institute of Technology (RIT) rioted throughout Rangoon, smashing windows and traffic lights down Insein Road, and universities in Rangoon temporarily closed. The government later allowed for reimbursement of up to 100 kyat so that students could return home instead of rioting in the cities. With the re-opening of schools in late October 1987, underground groups in Rangoon and Mandalay produced dissident leaflets which culminated in bombs exploding in November. Police later received threatening letters from underground groups, who organised small protests around the university campus. Meanwhile, larger protests in Mandalay involved monks and workers, with some burning government buildings and state businesses. Burmese state media reported little on the protests, but information quickly spread through the students.

Early democracy protests
After receiving Least Developed Country status from the United Nations Economic and Social Council in December 1987, government policy requiring farmers to sell produce below market rates to create greater revenue for the government sparked several, violent rural protests. The protests were fanned by public letters to Ne Win by former second in command General Brigadier Aung Gyi from July 1987, reminding him of the 1967 riots and condemning lack of economic reform, describing Burma as "almost a joke" compared to other Southeast Asian nations. He was later arrested.

On 12 March 1988, students from the RIT were arguing with out-of-school youths inside the Sanda Win tea shop about music playing on a sound system. A drunken youth would not return a tape that the RIT students favoured. A brawl followed in which one youth, who was the son of a BSPP official, was arrested and later released for injuring a student. Students protested at a local police department where 500 riot police were mobilised and in the ensuing clash, one student, Phone Maw, was shot and killed. The incident angered pro-democracy groups and the next day more students rallied at the RIT and spread to other campuses. The students, who had never protested before, increasingly saw themselves as activists. There was growing resentment towards military rule and there were no channels to address grievances, further exacerbated by police brutality, economic mismanagement and corruption within the government.

By mid-March, several protests had occurred and there was open dissent in the army. Various demonstrations were broken up by using tear gas canisters to disperse crowds. On 16 March, students demanding an end to one party rule marched towards soldiers at Inya Lake when riot police stormed from the rear, clubbing several students to death and raping others. Several students recalled the police shouting, "Don't let them escape" and "Kill them!".

Ne Win resigns
Following the latest protests, authorities announced the closure of universities for several months. By June 1988, large demonstrations of students and sympathisers were a daily sight. Many students, sympathisers and riot police died throughout the month as the protests spread throughout Burma from Rangoon. Large scale protests were reported in Pegu, Mandalay, Tavoy, Toungoo, Sittwe, Pakokku, Mergui, Minbu and Myitkyina. Demonstrators in larger numbers demanded multi-party democracy, which marked Ne Win's resignation on 23 July 1988. In a valedictory address given that day, Ne Win affirmed that "When the army shoots, it shoots to kill." He also promised a multi-party system, but he had appointed the largely disliked Sein Lwin, known as the "Butcher of Rangoon" to head a new government.

Main protests

1–7 August

Protests reached their peak in August 1988. Students planned for a nationwide demonstration on 8 August 1988, an auspicious date based on numerological significance. News of the protest reached rural areas and four days prior to the national protest, students across the country were denouncing Sein Lwin's regime and Tatmadaw troops were being mobilised. Pamphlets and posters appeared on the streets of Rangoon bearing the fighting peacock insignia of the All-Burma Students Union. Neighbourhood and strike committees were openly formed on the advice of underground activists, many of which were influenced by similar underground movements by workers and monks in the 1980s. Between 2 and 10 August, co-ordinated protests were occurring in most Burmese towns.

In the first few days of the Rangoon protests, activists contacted lawyers and monks in Mandalay to encourage them to take part in the protests. The students were quickly joined by Burmese citizens from all walks of life, including government workers, Buddhist monks, air force and navy personnel, customs officers, teachers and hospital staff. The demonstrations in the streets of Rangoon became a focal point for other demonstrations, which spread to other states' capitals. Upwards of 10,000 protesters demonstrated outside the Sule Pagoda in Rangoon, where demonstrators burned and buried effigies of Ne Win and Sein Lwin in coffins decorated with demonetised bank notes. Further protests took place around the country at stadiums and hospitals. Monks at the Sule Pagoda reported that the Buddha's image had changed shape, with an image in the sky standing on its head. On 3 August, the authorities imposed martial law from 8 pm to 4 am and a ban on gatherings of more than five people.

8–12 August

A general strike, as planned, began on 8 August 1988. Mass demonstrations were held across Burma as ethnic minorities, Buddhists, Christians, Muslims, students, workers and the young and old all demonstrated. The first procession circled Rangoon, stopping for people to speak. A stage was also erected. Demonstrators from the Rangoon neighbourhoods converged in downtown Rangoon. Only one casualty was reported at this point as a frightened traffic policeman fired into the crowd and fled. (Such marches would occur daily until 19 September.) Protesters kissed the shoes of soldiers, in an attempt to persuade them to join the civilian protest, whilst some encircled military officers to protect them from the crowd and earlier violence Over the next four days these demonstrations continued; the government was surprised by the scale of the protests and stated that it promised to heed the demands of the protesters "insofar as possible". Lwin had brought in more soldiers from insurgent areas to deal with the protesters.

In Mandalay Division, a more organised strike committee was headed by lawyers and discussion focused on multi-party democracy and human rights. Many participants in the protests arrived from nearby towns and villages. Farmers who were particularly angry with the government's economic policies joined the protests in Rangoon. In one village, 2,000 of the 5,000 people also went on strike.

A short while later, the authorities opened fire on the protesters. Ne Win ordered that "guns were not to shoot upwards," meaning that he was ordering the military to shoot directly at the demonstrators. Protesters responded by throwing Molotov cocktails, swords, knives, rocks, poisoned darts and bicycle spokes. In one incident, protesters burned a police station and tore apart four fleeing officers. On 10 August, soldiers fired into Rangoon General Hospital, killing nurses and doctors tending to the wounded. State-run Radio Rangoon reported that 1,451 "looters and disturbance makers" had been arrested.

Estimates of the number of casualties surrounding the 8-8-88 demonstrations range from hundreds to 10,000; military authorities put the figures at about 95 people killed and 240 wounded.

13–31 August
Lwin's sudden and unexplained resignation on 12 August left many protestors confused and jubilant. Security forces exercised greater caution with demonstrators, particularly in neighbourhoods that were entirely controlled by demonstrators and committees. On 19 August, under pressure to form a civilian government, Ne Win's biographer, Dr. Maung Maung, was appointed as head of government. Maung was a legal scholar and the only non-military individual to serve in the Burma Socialist Programme Party. The appointment of Maung briefly resulted in a subsidence of the shooting and protests.

Nationwide demonstrations resumed on 22 August 1988. In Mandalay, 100,000 people protested, including Buddhist monks and 50,000 demonstrated in Sittwe. Large marches took places from Taunggyi and Moulmein to distant ethnic states (particularly where military campaigns had previously taken place), where red, the symbolic colour for democracy was displayed on banners. Two days later, doctors, monks, musicians, actors, lawyers, army veterans and government office workers joined the protests. It became difficult for committees to control the protests. During this time, demonstrators became increasingly wary of "suspicious looking" people and police and army officers. On one occasion, a local committee mistakenly beheaded a couple thought to have been carrying a bomb. Incidents like these were not as common in Mandalay, where protests were more peaceful as they were organised by monks and lawyers.

On 26 August, Aung San Suu Kyi, who had watched the demonstrations from her mother's bedside, entered the political arena by addressing half a million people at Shwedagon Pagoda. It was at this point that she became a symbol for the struggle in Burma, particularly in the eyes of the Western world. Kyi, as the daughter of Aung San, who led the independence movement, appeared ready to lead the movement for democracy. Kyi urged the crowd not to turn on the army but find peace through non-violent means. At this point in time for many in Burma, the uprising was seen as similar to that of the People Power Revolution in the Philippines in 1986.

Around this time, former Prime Minister U Nu and retired Brigadier General Aung Gyi also re-emerged onto the political scene in what was described as a "democracy summer" when many former democracy leaders returned. Despite the gains made by the democracy movement, Ne Win remained in the background.

September
During the September congress of 1988, 90% of party delegates (968 out of 1080) voted for a multi-party system of government. The BSPP announced they would be organising an election, but the opposition parties called for their immediate resignation from government, allowing an interim government to organise elections. After the BSPP rejected both demands, protesters again took to the streets on 12 September 1988. Nu promised elections within a month, proclaiming a provisional government. Meanwhile, the police and army began fraternising with the protesters. The movement had reached an impasse relying on three hopes: daily demonstrations to force the regime to respond to their demands, encouraging soldiers to defect and appealing to an international audience in the hope that United Nations or United States troops would arrive. Some Tatmadaw did defect, but only in limited numbers, mostly from the Navy. Stephen Solarz who had experienced the recent democracy protests in the Philippines and South Korea arrived in Burma in September encouraging the regime to reform, which echoed the policy of the United States government towards Burma.

By mid-September, the protests grew more violent and lawless, with soldiers deliberately leading protesters into skirmishes that the army easily won. Protesters demanded more immediate change, and distrusted steps for incremental reform.

SLORC coup and crackdown

On 18 September 1988, the military retook power in the country. General Saw Maung repealed the 1974 constitution and established the State Law and Order Restoration Council (SLORC), "imposing more Draconian measures than Ne Win had imposed." After Maung had imposed martial law, the protests were violently broken up. The government announced on the state-run radio that the military had assumed power in the people's interest, "in order to bring a timely halt to the deteriorating conditions on all sides all over the country." Tatmadaw troops went through cities throughout Burma, indiscriminately firing on protestors.

Although an exact body count has not been determined as bodies were often cremated, it is estimated that within the first week of securing power, 1,000 students, monks, and schoolchildren were killed, and another 500 were killed whilst protesting outside the United States embassy – footage caught by a cameraman nearby who distributed the footage to the world's media. Maung described the dead as "looters". Protestors were also pursued into the jungle and some students took up training on the country's borders with Thailand.

By the end of September, there were around 3,000 estimated deaths and unknown number of injured, with 1,000 deaths in Rangoon alone. At this point in time, Aung San Suu Kyi appealed for help. On 21 September, the government had regained control of the country, with the movement effectively collapsing in October. By the end of 1988, it was estimated that 10,000 people, including protesters and soldiers, had been killed.

Aftermath
Many in Burma believed that the regime would have collapsed if the United Nations and neighbouring countries had refused to recognise the legitimacy of the coup. Western governments and Japan cut aid to the country. Among Burma's neighbours, India was most critical; condemning the suppression, closing borders and setting up refugee camps along its border with Burma. By 1989, 6,000 NLD supporters had been detained and those who fled to the ethnic border areas, such as Kawthoolei, formed groups with those who sought greater self-determination. It was estimated 10,000 had fled to mountains which were controlled by ethnic insurgents such as the Karen National Liberation Army, and many of them later trained to become soldiers.

After the uprising, the SLORC waged a "clumsy propaganda" campaign against those who had organised the protests. Intelligence Chief Khin Nyunt, held English-language press conferences which were aimed at giving foreign diplomats and the media a favourable account of the SLORC's response to the protests. During this period, more restrictions were imposed upon the Burmese media, denying it the relative freedom to report news which it had been able to exercise at the peak of the protests. In the conferences, he detailed a conspiracy in which the right was plotting to overthrow the regime with the assistance of "subversive foreigners" and a conspiracy in which the left was plotting to overthrow the State. Despite the conferences, few believed the government's version of events. While these conferences were going on, the SLORC was secretly negotiating with mutineers.

Between 1988 and 2000, the Burmese government established 20 museums which detailed the military's central role throughout Burma's history and the size of the military increased from 180,000 to 400,000. The Burmese government also kept schools and universities closed in order to prevent future uprisings. Initially, Aung San Suu Kyi, U Tin Oo and Aung Gyi publicly rejected the SLORC's offer to hold elections the following year, claiming that they could not be freely held while Burma was under military rule.

Significance
Today, the uprising is commemorated by Burmese expatriates and citizens. In Thailand, students also commemorate the uprising every 8 August. On the 20th anniversary of the uprising, 48 activists were arrested for commemorating the event in Burma. The event garnered much support for the Burmese people internationally. Poems were written by students who participated in the protests. The 1995 film Beyond Rangoon is a fictionalized drama which is based on the events that took place during the uprising.

The uprising led to the death and imprisonment of thousands of individuals. Many of the deaths occurred inside the prisons, where prisoners of conscience were subjected to inhumane torture and deprived of basic provisions, such as food, water, medicine, and sanitation. From 1988 to 2012, the military and the police illegally detained and imprisoned tens of thousands of leaders of the Burmese pro-democracy movement, as well as intellectuals, artists, students, and human rights activists. Pyone Cho, one of the leaders of the uprising, spent 20 years of his adult life in prison. Ko Ko Gyi, another leader of the uprising, spent 18 years of his life in prison. Min Ko Naing was placed in solitary confinement for nine years for his role as a leader of the uprising. Because the uprising began as a student movement, many of the individuals who were arrested, imprisoned, tortured, and killed by the police and the military were high school and university students.

Many of the student leaders of the uprising became lifelong human rights activists and leaders of the Burmese pro-democracy movement. Nineteen years later, many of these same activists also played a role in the 2007 Saffron Revolution. The 88 Generation Students Group, which is named after the events of 8 August 1988, organised one of the first protests which eventually culminated in the Saffron Revolution. But prior to the outbreak of large-scale demonstrations, its members were arrested and given lengthy prison sentences of up to 65 years. The activists who were arrested included prominent individuals such as Min Ko Naing, Mya Aye, Htay Kywe, Mie Mie, Ko Ko Gyi, Pyone Cho, Min Zeyar, Ant Bwe Kyaw, and Nilar Thein. Though not an 88 Generation Students Group member, a solo protester Ohn Than also joined the demonstration. All of them were released in a general amnesty in 2012. They continue to work as politicians and human rights activists in Myanmar. They also campaigned for the National League for Democracy in the 2015 general election. Pyone Cho, one of the main leaders of the 88 Generation, was elected to the House of Representatives in the 2015 Election.

Gallery

See also
 All Burma Students' Democratic Front
 Depayin massacre

References

Bibliography

Books and journals
 Boudreau, Vincent. (2004). Resisting Dictatorship: Repression and Protest in Southeast Asia. Cambridge University Press. .
 Burma Watcher. (1989). Burma in 1988: There Came a Whirlwind. Asian Survey, 29(2). A Survey of Asia in 1988: Part II pp. 174–180.
 Callahan, Mary. (1999). Civil-military relations in Burma: Soldiers as state-builders in the postcolonial era. Preparation for the State and the Soldier in Asia Conference.
 Callahan, Mary. (2001). Burma: Soldiers as State Builders. ch. 17. cited in Alagappa, Muthiah. (2001). Coercion and Governance: The Declining Political Role of the Military in Asia. Stanford University Press. 
 Clements, Ann. (1992). Burma: The Next Killing Fields? Odonian Press. 
 Delang, Claudio. (2000). Suffering in Silence, the Human Rights Nightmare of the Karen People of Burma. Parkland: Universal Press.
 Europa Publications Staff. (2002). The Far East and Australasia 2003. Routledge. .
 Ferrara, Federico. (2003). Why Regimes Create Disorder: Hobbes's Dilemma during a Rangoon Summer. The Journal of Conflict Resolution, 47(3), pp. 302–325.
 Fink, Christina. (2001). Living Silence: Burma Under Military Rule. Zed Books. 
 Fong, Jack. (2008). Revolution as Development: The Karen Self-determination Struggle Against Ethnocracy (1949–2004). Boca Raton, FL:BrownWalker Press. 
 Ghosh, Amitav. (2001). The Kenyon Review, New Series. Cultures of Creativity: The Centennial Celebration of the Nobel Prizes. 23(2), pp. 158–165.
 Hlaing, Kyaw Yin. (1996). Skirting the regime's rules.
 Lintner, Bertil. (1989). Outrage: Burma's Struggle for Democracy. Hong Kong: Review Publishing Co.
 Lintner, Bertil. (1990). The Rise and Fall of the Communist Party of Burma (CPB). SEAP Publications. .
 Lwin, Nyi Nyi. (1992). Refugee Student Interviews. A Burma-India Situation Report.
 Maung, Maung. (1999). The 1988 Uprising in Burma. Yale University Southeast Asia Studies. 
 Silverstein, Josef. (1996). The Idea of Freedom in Burma and the Political Thought of Daw Aung San Suu Kyi. Pacific Affairs, 69(2), pp. 211–228.
 Smith, Martin. (1999). Burma – Insurgency and the Politics of Ethnicity. Zed Books. 
 Steinberg, David. (2002). Burma: State of Myanmar. Georgetown University Press. 
 Tucker, Shelby. (2001). Burma: The Curse of Independence. Pluto Press. 
 Wintle, Justin. (2007). Perfect Hostage: a life of Aung San Suu Kyi, Burma’s prisoner of conscience. New York: Skyhorse Publishing. 
 Yawnghwe, Chao-Tzang. Burma: Depoliticization of the Political. cited in Alagappa, Muthiah. (1995). Political Legitimacy in Southeast Asia: The Quest for Moral Authority. Stanford University Press. 
 Yitri, Moksha. (1989). The Crisis in Burma: Back from the Heart of Darkness? University of California Press.

Further reading

 AP. (1988).  Burma Imposes Martial Law In the Capital After a Protest, The New York Times, 4 August 1988.
 AP. (1988).  Road To Upheaval In Politics For Burmese, The New York Times, 11 September 1988.
 Cumming-Bruce, Nick. (1988). Burma's new leader imposes martial law, The Guardian, 4 August 1988.
 Faulder, Dominic. (2008). Memories of 8 August 1988 The Irrawaddy, August 2008.
 Kamm, Henry. (1988).  Tension Reported High In Burma After Clashes, The New York Times, 2 July 1988.
 Mydans, Seth. (1988).  A Burmese Power Shift; Though Government Schedules Election, Decision Rests With People in the Streets, The New York Times, 12 September 1988.
 Mydans, Seth. (1988). Defections Strain Burmese Military, The New York Times, 10 September 1988.
 Mydans, Seth. (1988).  Many in Burma Say Ne Win Continues to Pull the Strings, The New York Times, 13 September 1988.
 Richburg, Keith. (1988). Youths, Monks Fight Troops in Burma; Post-Coup Deaths Reported in Hundreds. Washington Post, 20 September 1988.
 Stewart, William. (1988). Burma The Armed Forces Seize Power, TIME, 26 September 1988.
 Protests mark Burma anniversary, BBC News, 8 August 2003.
 Burma's 1988 Protests, BBC News, 25 September 2007.
 Partial list of 8888 Uprising victims, The Irrawaddy, 1 January 2003.

External links
 Voices of '88, Soros.
  Video – 8888s anniversary activity in London Burmese' Embassy and Downing street, and Ms Suu Kyi's Birthday, calling for democratic reform in Burma
 8888 Photos, Burmese American Democratic Alliance.
 Photos of the 8888 Uprising (Blogspot)

Revolutions of 1989
Internal conflict in Myanmar
Conflicts in 1988
1988 protests
Burmese democracy movements
History of Myanmar (1948–present)
Massacres in Myanmar
Politics of Myanmar
Political repression
Rebellions in Asia
1988 in Burma
Protests in Myanmar
20th-century rebellions
Aung San Suu Kyi
Military coups in Myanmar